Larissa V. Rudova is a Russian studies scholar. She is the Yale B. and Lucille D. Griffith Professor of Modern Languages and Professor of German and Russian at Pomona College in Claremont, California.

Books

References

External links
Faculty page at Pomona College

Year of birth missing (living people)
Living people
Pomona College faculty
Russian studies scholars